4 Way Street is the third album by Crosby, Stills & Nash, their second as Crosby, Stills, Nash & Young, and their first live album. It was originally released as Atlantic Records SD-2-902, shipping as a gold record and peaking at No. 1 on the Billboard 200. A document of their tour from the previous year, the live recordings presented were taken from shows at the Fillmore East (New York City, New York) on June 2 through June 7, 1970; The Forum (Los Angeles, California) on June 26 through June 28, 1970; and the Auditorium Theatre (Chicago, Illinois) on July 5, 1970.

Background
At the time this album was recorded, tensions between the band members were high, with their dressing-room fights becoming the stuff of rock legend, even being referenced by Frank Zappa and the Mothers of Invention in their 1971 LP Fillmore East - June 1971. The tensions led to CSNY dissolving shortly after the recording of 4 Way Street; they would reconvene for a stadium tour in the summer of 1974. The next release of new studio material by the group proper would not be until CSN in 1977, without Neil Young.

Content
The original double album LP came packaged in a gatefold sleeve without a track listing. On the gatefold was a black-and-white picture of the band sitting on a bench, with the heads of Graham Nash and David Crosby framed by a wire clothes hanger hanging in front of them, with recording information and credits in the lower-right-hand corner. The only track listings appear on the album's labels and on the fold-out poster that also included full lyrics.

At the time of these concerts in mid-1970, many songs included on the eventual album had yet to be released as part of the combined and individual work of the four principals. Crosby's "The Lee Shore" had been recorded during the sessions for Déjà Vu but would not appear until the band's 1991 box set, and his controversial ménage à trois composition "Triad," which had been recorded but not released by his former band The Byrds, had been recorded by Jefferson Airplane on their Crown of Creation album but this is the first issued performance by Crosby himself. "Love the One You're With" would be the hit single taken from Stephen Stills, Stills's debut solo album, released later that year 1970. "Chicago" by Nash would appear on his Songs for Beginners released in 1971, the same year as 4 Way Street, while "Right Between the Eyes" would be later surface as a demo on his box set Reflections. "Don't Let It Bring You Down" and "Southern Man" by Young would be released on After the Gold Rush, his third album also released later that year. Young's "On the Way Home" had appeared on the final Buffalo Springfield album, but with a lead vocal by Richie Furay rather than Young. Stills' "49 Bye-Byes/America's Children" medley interpolates the only top ten hit by Buffalo Springfield, his song "For What It's Worth." The band did include both sides of what was at the time of the shows their new record, the single "Ohio" and its B-side "Find the Cost of Freedom."

Sides one and two featured acoustic guitars and demonstrated the band as a group of individuals also pursuing independent careers while sides three and four featured the full band playing electric guitars and rock and roll. On sides one and two and on the 1992 bonus tracks, Crosby, Stills, Nash and Young all performed solo while Crosby & Nash previewed their later partnership with "The Lee Shore" and "Right Between the Eyes" performed by the pair.

On April 13, 2019, for Record Store Day, Atlantic Records released a three-LP version of the 1992 Expanded Edition.  It was mastered by Chris Bellman and pressed on 180-gram vinyl.  Sides 1, 2, 3 and 4 contained the original track listing of the 1971 version, while the additional tracks "King Midas In Reverse", "Laughing", and "Black Queen" were pressed on Side 5, and "The Loner/Cinnamon Girl/Down By The River" were pressed on Side 6.

Reception
The album reached number one on the Billboard 200 upon its release and also garnered a positive review in Rolling Stone, in which critic George Edward Kimball called it "their best album to date." Other contemporary reviews have also been positive.

Nash produced an expanded form of 4 Way Street for compact disc, released on June 15, 1992. The expanded edition included four solo performances on acoustic guitars, one by each member. Neil Young performed a medley of three songs from his first two solo albums; Stephen Stills included the at-the-time unreleased "Black Queen" from his eponymous debut; Crosby contributed his also yet to be issued "Laughing" from his 1971 debut LP; and Nash performed "King Midas in Reverse," The Hollies' single from 1967, which although credited to Allan Clarke, Nash and Tony Hicks, was written solely by Nash.

Additional tracks from the tour appeared on the CSN box set released in 1991, as well as Young's The Archives Vol. 1 1963–1972 released in 2009.

Track listing
Bonus tracks for 1992 compact disc reissue appear appended to disc one after sides one and two. Disc two contains sides three and four.

Disc one: 42:58, 66:43 with bonus tracks

Side one

Side two

1992 bonus track listing

Disc two: 43:01

Side three

Side four

Personnel
Musicians
 David Crosby – vocals, guitar
 Stephen Stills – vocals, guitar, piano, organ
 Graham Nash – vocals, guitar, piano, organ
 Neil Young – vocals, guitar
 Calvin "Fuzzy" Samuels – bass
 Johnny Barbata – drums
Production
 Crosby, Stills, Nash & Young – producers
 Bill Halverson – engineer
 Gary Burden – art direction/design, photography all others
 Joel Bernstein – photography center squares
 Henry Diltz – inside sleeve photography
 Joe Gastwirt – digital remastering
 Elliot Roberts and associates — management
 David Geffen — direction

Charts

Year-end charts

Certifications

References

Crosby, Stills, Nash & Young live albums
Live at the Fillmore East albums
Neil Young live albums
1971 live albums
Atlantic Records live albums
Albums produced by David Crosby
Albums produced by Graham Nash
Albums produced by Stephen Stills
Albums produced by Neil Young